Azra Sherwani (1940–2005) was a Pakistani television actress with a career spanning over 35 years who played a variety of roles. Amongst her most memorable roles are Ghazi Apa in Uncle Urfi, Saliha Begum in Aangan Terha, Apa Begum in Tanhaiyaan and Fazeelat in Dhoop Kinarey.

Early life
Azra was born in 1940 in Meerut, British India.

Career
She began her career with the Rawalpindi Studios of PTV in the late 1960s.

Sherwani worked with some of the best producers in the country including Mohsin Ali, Shereen Khan, Shahzad Khalil, Sultana Siddiqui, Zaheer Khan and Sahira Kazmi. She also worked with some of the best writers of her time including Fatima Surayya Bajia, Haseena Moin and Anwar Maqsood.

The role of Apa Begum in Haseena Moin's Tanhaiyaan was undoubtedly the most famous of her career where Shahzad Khalil cast her as a tough taskmaster who ill-treated her employee, Buqrat, played by Jamshed Ansari. She logically argued (and winning in the end, of course) with him as to why he should get bus fare when walking can improve his health and solve the problem.  Her character wanted her brother (Qazi Wajid as Faraan) to marry a dominant woman which, fortunately, does not happen.

As Ghazi Apa in Uncle Urfi, she stood between the two love birds, quarrelled regularly with Hasnat Bhai (Jamshed Ansari again) and was the dominant force behind the extremely funny Shaheer Bhai (Qurban Jilani). In Sitara Aur Mehrunissa, she played the selfish mother of Sitara (Atiqa Odho) and in Aangan Terha, she played the despised mother-in-law aka Saliha Begum of Mahboob Ahmed (Shakeel).
 
Then she was the villainous Mai Jaina in Mera Naam Mangu in the early 1970s — a play about professional beggars — while she excelled in Haseena Moin's Parchaiyan as part of a star cast comprising Rahat Kazmi, Sahira Kazmi, Shakeel and Talat Hussain. She held her own in Bajiya's Afshan with fellow cast members Shafi Mohammad, Shakeel, Qazi Wajid, Ishrat Hashmi and Begum Khurshid Mirza. In short, her histrionic talent set the standards for character acting on Pakistan television.

Azra Sherwani worked with actors of all generations — from Qazi Wajid, Subhani Ba Yunus, Imtiaz Ahmed, Begum Khurshid Mirza, Qurban Jilani, Shakeel, Shafi Mohammad, Talat Iqbal, Anwar Maqsood, Akbar Subhan, Behroze Sabzwari, Shahnaz Sheikh, Marina Khan, Ishrat Hashmi, Jamshed Ansari, Babar Ali, Mazhar Ali, Mishi Khan, Atiqa Odho, Sania Saeed, Sajid Hasan and Sadia Imam.

When the advent of private productions brought about the decline of quality plays on PTV, Azra Sherwani sustained for some time, working in plays such as Kanwal, Fatima Surayya Bajia's Ghar Ik Nagar and Sultana Siddiqui's Doosri Duniya. Her most memorable role during the later part of her career was that of Khala Khairan in Riffat Humayun's serial of the same name. Her character was such that she quarrels with Qazi Wajid, a tenant in the house of Khala's folks who refuses to either leave or pay the rent.

Personal life 
Sherwani was born in Meerut, India, according to family sources. She married Nafees Sherwani, Air Commodore in the Pakistan Air Force.

Death 
She died on 19 December 2005, in Oklahoma City, Oklahoma, United States.

Filmography

Television series 
 Uncle Urfi
 Raat Ki Roshni
 Parchaiyan
 Afshan
 Ana
 Akhri Chattan
 Tanhaiyaan 
 Dhoop Kinarey 
 Mera Naam Mangu
 Stolen
 Ghar Ik Nagar
 Aangan Terha
 Sherry and Jozy
 Janay Kyun
 Sitara Aur Mehrunissa
 Kanwal
 Aagahi
 Khala Khairan
 Doosri Dunya

References

External links
 
 Dawn Tribuite
 Tribute

1940 births
2005 deaths
Muhajir people
Pakistani film actresses
Pakistani television actresses
20th-century Pakistani actresses
21st-century Pakistani actresses
People from Meerut